Code 8: Part II is an upcoming Canadian science fiction action film serving as a sequel to the 2019 film Code 8. Directed by Jeff Chan, who co-wrote the screenplay with Chris Paré, Sherren Lee, and Jesse LaVercombe, the film will have Robbie Amell and Stephen Amell reprise their roles as Connor Reed and Garrett Kelton from the original film.

Premise

Cast
 Robbie Amell as Connor Reed
 Stephen Amell as Garrett Kelton

Production
The film is a sequel to the 2019 film Code 8. On June 1, 2021, it was announced Robbie Amell and Stephen Amell would produce the sequel and reprise their roles from the original film. On June 14, Ted Sarandos announced Netflix had acquired the rights to the feature film. Filming was scheduled to begin in Toronto in October 2021. Cast members confirmed filming had begun in November 2021, with Amell teasing the possibility of Code 8: Part III.

References

External links
 

Canadian science fiction action films
Canadian sequel films
English-language Canadian films
English-language Netflix original films
Films shot in Toronto
Upcoming English-language films
Upcoming films
Upcoming Netflix original films